The 1966 South Pacific Games was the second time that basketball was played at the South Pacific Games. Nine teams competed in the men's competition while for the first time a women's competition took place with five teams competing in the women's tournaments.

French Polynesia took out both gold medals with the national team defeating New Caledonia in the men's final while they defeated Papua New Guinea in the women's.

Medal summary

Men's tournament

Group stage

Group A

Group B

Knockout stage

Semi-finals

Bronze-medal match

Gold-medal match

Women's tournament

Round robin

Knockout stage

Semi-finals

Bronze-medal match

Gold-medal match

References

1966 Pacific Games
1966
Pacific